Oğuz Akbulut (born 6 May 1992) is a Turkish Paralympian athlete competing in the T12 and T13 disability classes sprint and middle-distance events.

Private life
,Oğuz Akbulut was born in Sivas, Turkey on 6 May 1992. He had sight loss rom birth.

He is married to middle-distance visual-impaired para-athlete Oznur Alumur.

Sport career
Akbulut was admitted to the Turkey national team in 2012. He participated at the 2012 IPC Athletics European Championships held in Stadskanaal, Netherlands, and won the bronze medal in the 800m T13 evemt. His participation in the 1500m T13 (4th place) and 5000m T13 (5th place) events at the 2014 IPC Athletics European Championships in Swansea, Wales remained without a medal. He won the  bronze medal in the 400m B2-B3 event at the 2017 Islamic Solidarity Games in   Baku, Azerbaijan. He became bronze medalist in the 400m T12 event at the 2017 World Para Athletics Championships in London, United Kimgdom. At the 2018 World Para Athletics European Championships in Berlin, Germany, he took the gold medal in the 400m T12 event, and set a championship record with 49.92. He won the bronze medal in the 400m T12 event at the 2019 World Para Athletics Championships in Dubai, United Arab Emirates.

He qualified to compete in the 400m T12 event at the 2020 Summer Paralympics.

References

1992 births
Living people
Sportspeople from Sivas
Turkish blind people
Visually impaired middle-distance runners
Male competitors in athletics with disabilities
Turkish male sprinters
Turkish male middle-distance runners
Athletes (track and field) at the 2020 Summer Paralympics
Paralympic athletes of Turkey
Visually impaired sprinters
21st-century Turkish people